Plesiastraea is a genus of corals. It is the only genus in the monotypic family Plesiastreidae.

Species
The following species are recognized in the genus Plesiastraea:
 †Plesiastrea costata (Duncan, 1880) 
 †Plesiastrea decipiens (Duncan, 1880) 
 †Plesiastrea pedunculata (Duncan, 1880) 
 Plesiastrea versipora (Lamarck, 1816)

References

Scleractinia genera
Plesiastreidae